Warwick River Shire was one of eight shires created in colonial Virginia in 1634. It was located on the Virginia Peninsula on the northern shore of the James River between Hampton Roads and the Jamestown Settlement.

During the 17th century, shortly after establishment of Jamestown in 1607, English settlers had explored and began settling the areas adjacent to Hampton Roads. By 1634, the English colony of Virginia consisted of eight shires or counties with a total population of approximately 5,000 inhabitants.

Warwick River Shire took its name from Robert Rich, second Earl of Warwick and a prominent member of the Virginia Company. Warwick River Shire became Warwick County in 1643. Rich's Richneck Plantation was located in the modern day independent city of Newport News, Virginia.

See also
Warwick County, Virginia
Newport News, Virginia
List of former United States counties

Virginia shires
History of Newport News, Virginia
1634 establishments in Virginia
Populated places established in 1634